Judson, also called Buchanan or Buchanans Springs, is an unincorporated community in Washington Township, Parke County, in the U.S. state of Indiana.

History
Judson was platted in 1872. The community bears the name of Adoniram Judson, a Baptist missionary. A post office has been in operation at Judson since 1872.

Geography

References

Unincorporated communities in Indiana
Unincorporated communities in Parke County, Indiana